Emmanuele Matino (born 7 October 1998) is an Italian football player. He plays for  club Bari on loan from Potenza.

Club career

Serie D and Latina
He started his career at the age of 16 with Serie D club Puteolana. In August 2015, he joined Latina and was assigned to their Under-19 team, only making one bench appearance in Serie B before being sent on loan to another Serie D club Nocerina in January 2017. At the end of 2016–17 season, his parent club Latina went bankrupt, and he stayed in Nocerina on a permanent basis, spending another season in the Serie D.

Parma
On 6 July 2018, he signed a three-year contract with Serie A club Parma.

Loan to Potenza
On 18 July 2018, he was loaned by Parma to Serie C club Potenza.
He made his Serie C debut for Potenza on 25 September 2018 in a game against Juve Stabia as a 75th-minute substitute for Nicola Strambelli.

Cavese
On 10 July 2019, he joined Cavese on loan. On 25 September 2020, he moved to Cavese on a permanent basis and signed a two-year contract.

Juve Stabia
On 20 July 2022, Matino signed with Juve Stabia. On 1 September 2022, he was loaned back to Potenza, with an option to buy.

Bari
On 31 January 2023, Matino joined Serie B club Bari on loan with an obligation to buy, signing a contract until 2026 with the club.

References

External links
 

1998 births
Footballers from Naples
Living people
Italian footballers
Association football defenders
Latina Calcio 1932 players
A.S.D. Nocerina 1910 players
Parma Calcio 1913 players
Potenza Calcio players
Cavese 1919 players
S.S.C. Bari players
Serie C players
Serie D players